Pristis lathami is a species of extinct sawfish in the family Pristidae. It lived in the Eocene era, in areas in Egypt, Nigeria, Togo, the United Kingdom, the United States, and Western Sahara, in marine areas, estuaries, bays, open shallow subtidal areas, coastal, marginal marine areas, deep waters, offshore, and fluvial-deltaic areas. P. lathami has 53 occurrences, with 1 being found in Egypt with a rostal tooth about 10 cm in length.

References

lathami
Fossil taxa described in 1837
Prehistoric fish of Africa
Prehistoric fish of North America
Prehistoric fish of Europe
Fossils of Nigeria
Fossils of Egypt